The Signal is a 2014 American science fiction thriller film directed by William Eubank, and written by William and Carlyle Eubank and David Frigerio. The film stars Brenton Thwaites and Laurence Fishburne. It premiered at the 2014 Sundance Film Festival, and was theatrically released in the United States on June 13, 2014.

Plot 
Three MIT students – Jonah, Nic, and Haley – are on a road trip to move Haley to California, a decision that stresses Nic's relationship with Haley. Nic walks with forearm crutches, and the possibility of  muscular dystrophy, multiple sclerosis, or some other degenerative disease is implied but never specified. Haley feels Nic is distancing himself from her and Nic explains he does not want his disability to hold her back. During their stay in a hotel, Nic and Jonah discover that a hacker named NOMAD, who nearly got them expelled for breaking into MIT servers, has found their location and is taunting them with strange and ominous e-mails. They track NOMAD to an abandoned house in the middle of Nevada and decide to go after him. After finding nothing in the house, Nic and Jonah hear Haley scream and run outside, only to see her pulled into the sky before disappearing into a white light themselves.

Nic, now with the number 2.3.5.41 tattooed on his arm, wakes up in a strange and sterile underground research facility where he is questioned by Dr. Wallace Damon, the head of the "transition group" in charge of helping Nic to cope with his strange situation. Damon tells Nic what they encountered near the house was an EBE: an extraterrestrial biological entity. Nic remains in a state of disbelief. Dr. Damon then shows him footage from Nic's own video camera and pauses where an alien face can be seen peering from behind a tree. Nic is taken to his room where he hears Jonah talking to him through a small vent in the wall, saying "(his) body feels weird." Nic also notices that his legs, previously weak but functional, are now completely numb. When Dr. Damon questions him again, Nic tries to get answers about Haley's condition (who is in a coma at the time), but is unsuccessful. Following an unexplained experiment on a cow in another part of the facility, a security alarm goes off and Nic, along with other personnel, finds large dents with scorch marks running across the walls and no sign of Jonah. Nic asks Damon where Jonah went but Damon tells him that Jonah was never recovered from the house. Increasingly agitated, Nic tries to break Haley out but is intercepted. After being restrained, he is shocked to discover that his legs have been amputated and replaced by prostheses made from alien technology. Nic then uses these super-powered limbs to break Haley and himself out of the facility, only to discover they are in the middle of a vast barren desert.

After hitching a ride with an old lady who seems sweet yet oddly troubled, Nic and Haley hijack an 18-wheeler truck to try to find a way around the seemingly endless canyon that extends around the facility and surrounding area. At a visitors center, they come across Jonah disguised as one of the facility workers dressed in a white hazmat suit. Jonah reveals that he too had limbs taken from him, as his forearms and hands have been replaced with the same alien technology as Nic's legs. Jonah speculates that they are in Area 51 (because they both have the same tattooed number, which adds up to 51), and that this is all a test. After Nic discovers indications of alien technology also implanted in Haley's spine, the trio drive up to a military checkpoint. Jonah then tries to hack into their computer system, only to be stopped by a hail of gunfire from the facility personnel, which causes damage to his eyeglasses and ruins his ability to see the computer correctly. Nic and Jonah hug as the fatally wounded Jonah prepares for his final stand that will allow Nic and Haley to escape. Jonah uses his remaining strength and prosthetic alien arms to subdue the group of soldiers. However, Nic and Haley's escape is short-lived; as they approach the only bridge that would take them over the canyon to the outside world, they run into Damon and his military men, who blow out the truck's tires. Haley is evacuated by helicopter beyond the canyon and, knowing that Nic has mastered the use of his legs, Damon tells Nic "you can't reach her." After hearing a loud horn coming from the sky, Nic realizes that Damon is NOMAD (Damon spelled backwards). Damon then explains that it was Nic who came looking for him, that this was his fault, and adding that Nic is "the perfect integration of human will and alien technology. Our finest achievement." Agitated and emotionally compromised, Nic's bionic legs enable him to sprint at supersonic speed across the bridge where he hits an invisible barrier and breaks through.

Nic finds himself inside what appears to be a different, larger exterior facility. Housed within it, through the broken barrier, can be seen 'Area 51", the Earth-like world with the canyon city.  Looking in through the hole towards the bridge, he sees Damon walk up and remove his helmet to reveal that he is actually a robotic alien, with merely a human-like face. Nic turns back around, and through the glass sees stars and outer space.  He realizes he is not in a government facility, but is actually on an immense alien spacecraft numbered 2.3.5.41 (matching the numerical tattoo on his arm) that is about to dock at their home world (signaled by the horn).  A final zoom-out view reveals the whole ship, with a parabolic sun shield on the top and a large alien city, complete with skyscrapers, pointing away from the alien sun. In the distance, another similar city ship can be seen.

Cast 
 Brenton Thwaites as Nic Eastman
 Laurence Fishburne as Dr. Wallace Damon
 Olivia Cooke as Haley Peterson
 Beau Knapp as Jonah Breck
 Lin Shaye as Mirabelle
 Robert Longstreet as James
 Jeffrey Grover as Gil, Gas Station Clerk

Themes
The filmmakers have stated that they wrote the film primarily as an exploration of the conflict between logic and emotion. Director William Eubank stated in an interview, "The Signal, for me, is about choices and sort of what drives somebody – the decisions we make, whether we make them based on thinking logically or thinking emotionally. Nic is sort of a character who's being – he wants to be logical, because he believes from his computer background that is a stronger way to live your life, and that's a more reasonable way to live your life. Black and white decisions, yes or nos. Then he's sort of challenged to make an emotional choice. At the very start, he was sort of trying to push those emotions away... At the end of the movie, he chooses to embrace that emotional side and make a choice based on a feeling."

Co-writer Carlyle Eubank explained the film similarly, saying "The real crux of the film is how the characters... find who they are as people through adversity."

Actor Brenton Thwaites stated the film's metaphoric message of following one's heart over reason was what drew him to the project, saying "I love the little messages and metaphors throughout the film that tell you to really chase what you believe in and follow your heart... the message is so beautiful."

Screenwriter David Frigerio echoed his co-writers' sentiments in his explanation of the film's themes:

Through metaphor, the film intends to explore the idea that though sometimes humans may attempt to live their lives based on rules and logic, working diligently to suppress their feelings, deep down there are emotions that cannot be eliminated. The so-called "Signal" is that internal gnawing fire of a human's inner voice that can tell what is true if listened for, and that makes humans human. Eubank explained the meaning of the film's title by saying the "Signal" is a "waiting for something, listening for something, having an open heart... there's levels of what the 'Signal' really is."

In the film, the character Nic finally listens and hears "The Signal", and in a fiery burst discovers his true feeling, love. Having found his emotions, Nic chooses to follow a course of action based on love. Eubank discussed this in saying the critical part of the film is "to watch [Nic] arc out, to decide 'You know what, I’ve been trying to think logically about this the whole time... and [have] always been trying to run away from my emotions, here's a situation that says logically I shouldn't do this or I'm at great risk if I do this, so logically I should do nothing.' And he decides to do something, and to go for it, and he embraces it." This decision flies in the face of logic, but trusting love empowers him, and the transformation enables him to break out of the allegorical cave of darkness he had formerly found himself in and out into the wide field of reality.

At Sundance, the filmmakers and actor Brenton Thwaites described the film as a Twilight Zone–style story, drawing heavily on Plato's Allegory of the Cave, and intended as a modern interpretation of the 1939 film The Wizard of Oz, an element later noted by reviewers.

The film utilizes nontraditional storytelling directions, which have frustrated some reviewers.

Production

Casting 
Laurence Fishburne joined the cast on May 9, 2013.

Filming 
Filming began in May 2013 in New Mexico, on locations including Albuquerque, Los Lunas and Taos. The New Mexico Film Office also announced the start of filming. On June 18 and 19, crews were filming scenes on the Rio Grande Gorge Bridge.

Music 
The musical score for The Signal was written by composer and experimental musical instrument designer Nima Fakhrara. Fakhrara, who has a background as a dulcimer player and student of Persian classical music, approached the production seeking to contribute, having been a fan of Eubank's earlier film Love.

As half of the film takes place indoors, Fakhara produced a number of custom instruments for the film designed to limit resonance, including a pagoda made of ceramic insulators, gongs, a number of bowed instruments, a steel marimba, and a tenor violin fashioned with viola strings. When the characters journey outdoors, the music and instruments change. A number of the custom instruments had to be transported to Skywalker Ranch, where Fakhrara was mastering the score. The music supervisor was Aminé Ramer.

Fakhrara and Eubank went through 45 versions of the music for the opening credits scene before they chose a final version.

A soundtrack album was released by Varèse Sarabande on June 10, 2014.

Other songs featured in the film include:
 "La villa dei delitti" by Gabriele Bazzi Berneri
 "Tell Me Now" by Generationals
 "Union" by Deptford Goth
 "Piano Piece in A Major" by Mark Gordon
 "Pace, Pace, Mio Dio (From La forza del destino)" by Emilie De Voght
 "I'll Pretend" by Glen Morris
 "Ever Night Lulu" by Johnny Appleseed
 "2.3.5.41 (feat. William Grundler)" by Nima Fakhrara & Free the Robots
 Charles Gounod's "Ave Maria" (which he arranged from Johann Sebastian Bach's 1st keyboard Prelude in C major from the Well-Tempered Clavier.)

Distribution

Marketing 
On March 18, 2014, a teaser poster and some photos from the film were released, followed by the first official trailer next day. On March 26, 2014, Focus revealed a new poster for the film. On May 27, "ruagitated.com" was launched.

Theatrical release 
Originally supposed to be released by FilmDistrict, the project was transferred to Focus Features after the latter absorbed the former. Focus Features released the film worldwide on June 13, 2014 and in a limited release in North America for five weeks, grossing $600,896.

Home media 
The Signal was released in a Blu-ray/DVD/Digital HD combo pack on September 23, 2014 by Focus Features and Universal Studios Home Entertainment.  It earned $822,917 in video sales in the United States.

Reception 
, the film holds a 61% approval rating on review aggregator Rotten Tomatoes, based on 89 reviews with an average rating of 5.84 out of 10.  The site's consensus says, "Director William Eubank clearly has big ideas and an impressive level of technical expertise; unfortunately, The Signal fritters them away on a poorly constructed story." The film received a score of 54 out of 100 on Metacritic, based on 34 reviews.

Entertainment Weekly gave the film a "B" rating, saying, "Hard science fiction meets tender hearts in a slow-burn, twist-filled thriller... The trio wind up in an abandoned shack in the middle of the Nevada desert, where they are attacked by forces unknown. It gets worse!... What is happening? Will Nic escape? And do we even want him to, given that the facility's workers all wear protective suits when interacting with their guests/test subjects?" The review concludes that "all this sounds like a souped-up episode of The Twilight Zone or The X-Files."

Nicolas Rapold of The New York Times wrote, "William Eubank's The Signal demonstrates the fine line between paranoid science-fiction fantasy and demo reel... After a brief excursion into found-footage horror, Nic wakes up in one of those antiseptic, white-walled secret compounds used for human experimentation in the movies. Mr. Eubank plays with our minds, and Nic's, for a while." Rapold judges that "the story evolves into a kind of poor man's X-Men," though "the grandiosity of the film's setups partly fits in with the guys' sense of righteous-geek drama, and you wouldn't be surprised to see Mr. Eubank directing a bigger-budget movie down the road..."

Michael O'Sullivan of The Washington Post gave the film a one-and-a-half star rating and a half-scathing review: "Two of the major plot turns in The Signal—a good-looking sci-fi thriller with more fashion sense than brains—hinge on misdirection involving simple arithmetic and spelling. I won't spoil the fun by elaborating further, but when each moment arrives, it's cheapened by the implicit insult to the audience's intelligence. The twists feel less like jolts of genuine surprise than like being had by a third-grader with a good knock-knock joke." O'Sullivan adds, "I'll say one thing: The general state of confusion fostered by the head-scratching plot is a surprisingly effective way of maintaining continued engagement with it—if by 'engagement' you mean 'This better lead somewhere.' Oh, it does. It's just a less than wholly satisfying destination, despite some fun detours. (Veteran character actress Lin Shay, in a nutty little cameo, is one such pleasure.)"

In contrast, USA Today wrote, "Had Stanley Kubrick and David Lynch made a movie together, it might have looked something like The Signal. Visually stunning, emotionally stunted and weird as all get-out, this sci-fi tale (**1/2 stars out of four, rated PG-13...) isn't worthy of the canon of either master of disturbing imagery. But Signal thinks big, takes chances and has enough arresting scenes to stand apart from the science fiction films of late... Signal is so determined to remain mysterious—and pack a visual punch at the movie's climax—that it withholds too much... Instead, Signal aims to get you thinking. The story can be maddening to follow, but it sure is cool to look at."

Geoff Berkshire, who watched the film at the 2014 Sundance Film Festival, gave a similarly admiring yet disappointed review, calling it "Indebted to both District 9 and The Blair Witch Project, but unlikely to enjoy either of those films' sleeper success": "Exceedingly stylish and ultimately quite silly, The Signal is a sci-fi head trip better appreciated for the journey than the destination. The less audiences know going in, the more intrigued they'll be by the story's not entirely predictable twists and turns." He writes that when "the film pulls its flashiest twist, which turns Nic into something like the Six Billion Dollar Teen," "it's also the clear highlight of a film more interested in surface flash than in narrative coherence or character depth."

See also
 Alien abduction
 Dark City (1998 film)

References

External links 
 
 
 
 
 
 

2014 films
2010s science fiction thriller films
American science fiction thriller films
Techno-thriller films
Alien abduction films
Films about computing
Films about virtual reality
Films about disability in the United States
Films about couples
Films about friendship
Entertainment One films
Films set in 2015
Films set in Nevada
Films shot in New Mexico
Films shot in Ohio
Focus Features films
Films directed by William Eubank
2010s English-language films
2010s American films